Harry Hyde was a silent film actor who appeared in 73 American films during the decade from 1910 to 1920, most notably as Mabel Normand's character's suitor in D.W. Griffith's 1911 drama Her Awakening. He also wrote the screenplay for  The Sentimental Sister, a Blanche Sweet vehicle produced in 1914.

Biography
As was frequently the case during the dawn of cinema, Hyde's roles ran the gamut from leading man to unbilled extra, sometimes in the same week.  He portrayed Mary's suitor in D.W. Griffith's The Perfidy of Mary (1913) with Dorothy Gish, Mae Marsh, and Lionel Barrymore.

He  played Blanche Sweet's character's cuckolded husband in Griffith's Blind Love (1912), in which she deserts her marriage for another man, has a baby, then realizes that she should have stayed with her husband (Hyde) and attempts to return to him.

References

External links
 

20th-century American male actors
American male silent film actors
American male screenwriters
Place of birth missing
Year of birth missing
Year of death missing
Place of death missing